Brest-Tsentralny is the main railway station of Brest, Belarus.

History
The first building of the Brest station was built in 1886, and opened on 28 May in the presence of Emperor Alexander III.

It was built in the form of "medieval castle" with four water towers. The station was equipped with water heating. In the halls for passengers of the 1st and 2nd classes have parquet floors, 3rd class — plank, utility room — asphalt. Soon the station became the first in Russian Railways, have electric lighting — 160 light bulbs of 20 candles appeared in the halls and on platforms and 12 lights on 50 of candles lit up the station square.

In 1915, during the First world war, the station building was destroyed by the retreating Russian troops. The Polish authorities have constructed a new building. Visited Brest in 1949, Marshal Kliment Voroshilov, has contributed to the adoption of the decision on reconstruction of the station, which was held in 1953-1957.

International trains and destinations 
Because of the break-of-gauge at Brest, where Russian broad gauge railway track meets European standard gauge, all passenger trains travelling to or from Poland have their bogies replaced here to continue their journey and freight is transloaded from cars of one gauge to cars of another.

Photos

References

External links
 Website
 Photos

Railway stations in Belarus
Railway stations opened in 1886